The Republic of Guinea-Bissau follows a nonaligned foreign policy and seeks friendly and cooperative relations with a wide variety of states and organizations. France, Portugal, Angola, Brazil, Egypt, Nigeria, Libya, Cuba, the Palestine Liberation Organization, Ghana, and Russia have diplomatic offices in Bissau.

Bilateral relations

International membership 
Guinea-Bissau is a member of several international organizations: the United Nations and many of its specialized and related agencies, including the World Bank, the International Monetary Fund (IMF), the World Health Organization, the Food and Agriculture Organization, the Group of 77, and the International Civil Aviation Organization.

Guinea-Bissau is also a member of the African Development Bank (AFDB), the Economic Community of West African States (ECOWAS), the West African Economic and Monetary Union (WAEMU), the Organisation of Islamic Cooperation (OIC), the African Union (AU), and the permanent Interstate Committee for drought control in the Sahel (CILSS).

See also
 List of diplomatic missions in Guinea-Bissau
 List of diplomatic missions of Guinea-Bissau

References

 
Government of Guinea-Bissau
Politics of Guinea-Bissau